San Luis, officially the Municipality of San Luis,  is a 1st class municipality in the province of Agusan del Sur, Philippines. According to the 2020 census, it has a population of 35,196 people.

San Luis was created into a municipality on June 15, 1968, when the barrios of San Luis, Santa Inez, Nuevo Trabajo, Cualision and Baylo were separated from the municipality of Esperanza and constituted into the new town, through Republic Act 5262. Since the 1970s, the town's economy has been largely based on logging industries.

Geography

According to the Philippine Statistics Authority, the municipality has a land area of  constituting  of the  total area of Agusan del Sur.

Climate

Barangays
San Luis is politically subdivided into 25 barangays.

Demographics

In the 2020 census, San Luis had a population of 35,196.

Economy

References

External links
 [ Philippine Standard Geographic Code]

Municipalities of Agusan del Sur